Epyris is a genus of cuckoo wasps in the family Bethylidae. There are at least 50 described species in Epyris.

Species
These 59 species belong to the genus Epyris:

 Epyris aequalis Lim & S.Lee g
 Epyris afer Magretti, 1884 g
 Epyris apicalis Smith, 1874 g
 Epyris apterus Cameron, 1888 g
 Epyris arcuatus Kieffer, 1906 g
 Epyris asura Terayama, 2006 g
 Epyris azevedoi Tribull g
 Epyris bayeri Hoffer, 1935 g
 Epyris bilineatus Thomson, 1862 g
 Epyris biroi Moczar, 1966 g
 Epyris breviclypeatus Lim & S.Lee g
 Epyris brevipennis Kieffer, 1906 g
 Epyris californicus b
 Epyris carbunculus Nagy, 1970 g
 Epyris carpenteri Tribull g
 Epyris corcyraeus Kieffer, 1907 g
 Epyris darani Terayama, 2006 g
 Epyris dulicus Lim & S.Lee g
 Epyris enerterus Stein & Azevedo g
 Epyris erythrocerus Kieffer, 1906 g
 Epyris evanescens Kieffer, 1906 g
 Epyris finitus Lim & S.Lee g
 Epyris foveatus Kieffer, 1904 g
 Epyris fulgeocauda Tribull g
 Epyris fulvimanus Kieffer, 1907 g
 Epyris fuscipalpis Kieffer, 1906 g
 Epyris fuscipes Kieffer, 1906 g
 Epyris gaullei Kieffer, 1906 g
 Epyris hangunensis Terayama, 2005 g
 Epyris herschae Tribull g
 Epyris idaten Terayama, 2006 g
 Epyris inermis Kieffer, 1906 g
 Epyris insulanus Kieffer, 1906 g
 Epyris jeonbukensis Lim & S.Lee g
 Epyris limatulus Lim & S.Lee g
 Epyris loisae Tribull g
 Epyris longiantennatus Lim & S.Lee g
 Epyris longicephalus Terayama, 2005 g
 Epyris longicollis Kieffer, 1906 g
 Epyris macrocerus Kieffer, 1906 g
 Epyris macromma Kieffer, 1906 g
 Epyris marshalli Kieffer, 1906 g
 Epyris maximus Berland, 1928 g
 Epyris minor Kieffer, 1906 g
 Epyris mureungensis Lim & S.Lee g
 Epyris niger Westwood, 1832 g
 Epyris niwoh Terayama, 2006 g
 Epyris penatii Stein & Azevedo g
 Epyris quinquecarinatus Kieffer, 1906 g
 Epyris rufimanus Kieffer, 1914 g
 Epyris rufipes b
 Epyris sauteri (Enderlein, 1920) g
 Epyris sublevis Kieffer, 1904 g
 Epyris sudosanensis Lim & S.Lee g
 Epyris tardus Kieffer, 1906 g
 Epyris transversus Kieffer, 1906 g
 Epyris tricolor Cameron, 1888 g
 Epyris yamatonis Terayama, 1999 g
 Epyris yetus Lim & S.Lee g

Data sources: i = ITIS, c = Catalogue of Life, g = GBIF, b = Bugguide.net

References

Further reading

External links

 

Parasitic wasps
Chrysidoidea